An online college fair, or virtual college fair, is a relatively recent phenomenon that consists of a collection of colleges and universities that communicate and provide information online during a specific timeframe.  An online college fair operates according to several of the usual conventions of a “brick and mortar” college fair: there are event halls, schools have booths that prospective students and/or parents can visit to exchange information, and there are speaker sessions by various admissions and education experts.  However, the entire fair is contained online, and therefore an online college fair can also have many of the characteristics of a virtual world.
One of the main benefits of an online college fair is that travel cost is eliminated for both school representatives and students.

History
The first such online college fair was organized by the National Association for College Admission Counseling (NACAC) and held on October 9, 2001. Approximately 200 institutions participated; the number of participating students is unknown. This first online college fair was widely considered a failure as the number of students trying to log on overloaded the system. NACAC, which planned on conducting online college fairs on a regular basis, discontinued the program after the initial event.

Additional online college fair providers have come and gone.  Gradschools.com hosted an online college fair in conjunction with a live fair.  This event also ran into technical difficulties; namely firewall problems and recruiters that were not prepared to use the online chat features.  In November 2002, the Big Apple College Fair also had an online college fair in conjunction with a live fair.

In October 2007, BusinessWeek, which produces annual rankings of United States business school MBA programs, held an MBA Expo 2007 with the tagline “Find the B-School that fits you best.”  A total of 8 US and international business schools attended.

CollegeWeekLive entered the market on November 13, 2007 and continues as the leading provider of online college fairs today. CollegeWeekLive grew 67% in 2012.

CappexConnect launched in 2013. Part of the Cappex family of websites, CappexConnect is a website dedicated to hosting online college fairs and online open houses.

Current Online College Fairs
On March 23 & 24, 2011 CollegeWeekLive conducted the largest online college fair up until that date, with over 60,000 event attendees. The fair allowed attendees to interact with college admissions officials and college students from 250 schools via instant messaging and video chat.  The fair also included 15 keynote speakers addressing several topics including financial aid, diversity, college essays. etc. Speakers included Lynn O'Shaughnessy, college blogger at CBS MoneyWatch and Harlan Cohen, Author of The Naked Roommate.

CappexConnect hosts online college fairs multiple times throughout the year, providing students the opportunity to connect with hundreds of colleges and universities and thousands of students from across the country. Students can chat directly with college and university representatives as well as fellow prospective students. Students can watch live presentations from admissions experts and financial aid specialists on topics such as choosing a college, financial aid, and choosing a major. Attendees also have the opportunity to enter to win a college scholarship. On September 10, 2013, and October 9, 2013, CappexConnect hosted a fall fair series that included over 15,000 student attendees visiting online booths from over 90 colleges and universities.
 
College Fairs Online is a new website devoted to high quality virtual college fairs.  They hold college fairs by state and connect many colleges with prospective students.

VASA Virtual Education Expo conducts virtual education fairs which bring together universities and potential students.

With more people utilizing the web for college search information as well as with the spread of broadband internet access, online college fairs are becoming a major resource for college application information. Colleges are continuously using online chat as a way to connect with prospective students.

College fairs offer students that might not otherwise have easy access to college information or the ability to visit colleges. Univision Media, in collaboration with CollegeWeekLive, held a virtual college fair with several presentations in Spanish.

Notes

University and college admissions
Tertiary educational websites